The discography of American singer-songwriter Eric Nam consists of two studio albums, four extended plays, eleven singles, eleven collaboration singles, eight appearances in soundtracks and eighteen music videos.

Studio albums

Extended plays

Singles

As lead artist

Collaborations

Soundtrack appearances

Other charted songs

Music videos

References 

Discographies of American artists
Pop music discographies